Trechus arnoldii is a species of ground beetle in the subfamily Trechinae. It was described by Belousov in 1987.

References

arnoldii
Beetles described in 1987